Heronidrilus is a genus of annelids belonging to the family Naididae, first described by Christer Erséus and Barrie Jamieson in 1981.

The species of this genus are found in Australia, Europe.

Species:

Heronidrilus bihamis 
Heronidrilus clayi 
Heronidrilus fastigatus 
Heronidrilus gravidus 
Heronidrilus heronae 
Heronidrilus hutchingsae

References

Annelids
Taxa named by Christer Erséus